is a 524.0 meter high Japanese mountain in Sanda, Hyōgo, Japan. Another name of this mountain is Mount Koge.
 
Mount Hatsuka is an independent peak in Tamba Highland. This mountain is on a popular picnic course from Dojo Station to Kozuki Bus Stop of Shinki Bus. On the top of the mountain, Hatsuka Shrine is extant.

History 
This mountain was one of the mountains of the enduring ascetic practices for  Shugenja monks. On the foot of this mountain there is the Koge-ji temple.

Access
Kozuki Bus Stop of Shinki Bus
Koge Bus Stop of Shinki Bus

References
Sanda Tourist Bureau
Official Home Page of the Geographical Survey Institute in Japan

Hatsuka
Shugendō